Mount Zirkel is the highest summit of the Park Range of the Rocky Mountains of North America. Mount Zirkel was named in honor of German geologist Ferdinand Zirkel.

See also

List of mountain peaks of Colorado
List of the most prominent summits of Colorado
List of Colorado county high points

References

Mountains of Colorado
Mountains of Jackson County, Colorado
Mountains of Routt County, Colorado
Routt National Forest
Great Divide of North America
North American 3000 m summits